The Falling Man (in ) is a sculpture by French artist Auguste Rodin modeled in 1882 and is part of Rodin's emblematic group The Gates of Hell.

Gates of Hell
This figure represents the cumulative human forces, cast upon the eternal emptiness of Hell. In The Gates of Hell, the sculpture appears in three different places: at the top of the left door, at the top of the right pilaster— the one holding Crouching Woman as part of I am beautiful— and as the central piece of Avarice at the bottom of the Gates. Judging by the position of the first figure, some authors have suggested that Rodin suspected his commission would be canceled because the arched position of the man would make difficult, if not impossible, to open and close the doors, hindering its function.

Even though this figure appears in different directions in The Gates, its muscles stay the same; which hints at Rodin's idea of taking an artistic license regarding gravity.  This concept heralds the modernist movement, which favors expression over verisimilitude.

See also
List of sculptures by Auguste Rodin

Notes

References

External links

Falling Man
Falling Man
Falling Man
Falling Man
Falling Man
Arts in Mexico City